Thomas Terenzini is an American politician. He represents the Rutland-4 district in the Vermont House of Representatives.

References 

Republican Party members of the Vermont House of Representatives
Living people
Year of birth missing (living people)